Ecorse Public Schools is a school district headquartered in Ecorse, Michigan, United States. The district serves Ecorse.

In 2015 the district stated that it eliminated its budget deficit.

Schools
Zoned
 Ecorse Community High School (8-12)
 Grandport Academy (4-7)
 Ralph J. Bunche School (PreK-3)
 Hope Academy (16–19 years, formerly Kennedy Elementary School)
Magnet
 Project Excel (at Grandport Academy, 3-8)
Defunct
 Ecorse High School #1 (razed and replaced by Ecorse Community High School)
 Ecorse School No. 1 (razed) 
 Ecorse School No. 2 (razed and replaced by Dr. Charles Drew Academy)
 Ecorse School No. 3 (razed and replaced by Grandport Academy)
 Miller Elementary School (razed and replaced by a two-story structure)

References

External links

 Ecorse Public Schools
 Ecorse Public Schools (Archive)

School districts in Michigan
Education in Wayne County, Michigan
Ecorse, Michigan